Vladana Vučinić (born 18 July 1986), also known mononymously as Vladana, is a Montenegrin singer and songwriter. She represented Montenegro in the Eurovision Song Contest 2022 with the song "Breathe".

Life and career 
Vladana showed interest in music at an early age as her grandfather, Boris Nizamovski was the Head of the Association of Stage Artists of North Macedonia and manager of the Macedonian ensemble Magnifico. Vladana has a primary and secondary education in music, focusing on music theory and opera singing. She graduated with a degree in journalism from the Montenegro's State Faculty of Political Science.

In 2003, Vladana made her television debut on a national karaoke show, and in the same year she released a debut single which was performed at Budva Mediterranean Festival in Budva, Montenegro. On 3 March 2005, Vučinić participated in Montevizija 2005 with the song "". She placed 18th and thus failed to advance into Evropesma-Europjesma 2005 held on 4 March 2005. The following year, in 2006, she participated in Montevizija 2006 as a duet with Bojana Nenezić with the song "Željna". They advanced into the final where they placed 15th overall. Later that year, Vučinić performed her song "" at the newcomers section of the music festival Sunčane skale.

Vučinić released her first video for the single "", directed by Montenegrin director Nikola Vukčević, which became at that time the most-aired video in Montenegro. In 2007 she continued working with Vukčević and released her second video, for the single "".

In late 2009, Vučinić recorded and released her first single in English, "Bad Girls Need Love Too". A year later, in November 2010, an animated video for the song "Sinner City" was released as a prelude to her first English language album. Vučinić self-released her debut album titled Sinner City on 13 December 2010.

Vladana is the first solo performer from Montenegro broadcast on the regional MTV station MTV Adria.

She launched an online fashion magazine called Chiwelook based on editorials with fashion designers from Montenegro. As a founder and editor in chief, she contributed to the magazine through columns and interviews about fashion with different figures in music, culture and politics.

On 4 January 2022, it was announced that she had been selected by the Montenegrin broadcaster RTCG to represent Montenegro in the Eurovision Song Contest 2022. A day later, on 5 January 2022, it was announced that her Eurovision entry will be titled "Breathe" and performed in English. The song was released on 4 March 2022 alongside a music video. At Eurovision in Turin, she performed in second semi-final on 12 May 2022, but failed to qualify to the grand final. The song was later recorded and released in Finnish ("Jää"/Stay) and Italian ("Respira"/Breathe).

Discography

Studio albums

Singles

References

Eurovision Song Contest entrants of 2022
Eurovision Song Contest entrants for Montenegro
1986 births
Living people
Musicians from Podgorica
Montenegrin people of Macedonian descent
20th-century Montenegrin women singers
21st-century Montenegrin women singers